Rosamund "Posy" Musgrave (born 28 October 1986) is a British former cross-country skier.

Born in Cairo, Egypt, due to her father's work in the oil industry, she competed for Great Britain at the 2014 Winter Olympics in Sochi. She finished 41st in the women's sprint qualification event and 66th in the women's 10 kilometre classical event.

She is the older sister of fellow cross-country skier Andrew Musgrave. She graduated from Birmingham University with a BA in European Studies and Modern Languages in 2009.

In May 2015 she announced her retirement from competition and her appointment as an athlete manager with GMR Marketing.

On 3 July 2021, Posy married her partner Daniel Johnson in Aberdeenshire not far from her family home

References

1986 births
Living people
Scottish female cross-country skiers
Cross-country skiers at the 2014 Winter Olympics
Sportspeople from Aberdeenshire
Olympic cross-country skiers of Great Britain
Alumni of the University of Birmingham